Events from the year 1756 in Canada.

Incumbents
French Monarch: Louis XV
British and Irish Monarch: George II

Governors
Governor General of New France: Michel-Ange Duquesne de Menneville
Colonial Governor of Louisiana: Louis Billouart
Governor of Nova Scotia: Peregrine Hopson
Commodore-Governor of Newfoundland: Richard Dorrill

Events
 France sends two battalions to Canada, with provisions, and 1,300,000 livres, in specie, which has the effect of depreciating the paper currency by 25 per cent.
 March - A Canadien force of 300 captures Fort Bull, between Schenectady and Oswego, and puts the garrison to the sword.
 May - Montcalm reaches Quebec with 1,400 soldiers.
 The Canadiens, suffering from smallpox and famine, are burthened with the support of their Indian allies.
 Saturday August 14 - Though opposed to attacking any British fort, Montcalm, at the head of 3,100 regulars, Canadiens and Indians, captures Fort Oswego, - a success attributable, mainly, to his intercepting a message to General Webb, commanding 2,000 men in the vicinity. Colonel Mercer is killed. The garrison (1,780) and about 100 women and children are taken prisoners.
 The Marquis de Montcalm assumes a troubled command of French troops in North America. (The Seven Years' War between Britain and France begins in Europe).

Births
 Jean François Hamtramck, French Canadian officer that joined American revolution.

Deaths

Historical documents
British declaration of war against France mentions encroachment "particularly in our province of Nova Scotia" and French troop buildup

William Johnson delivers some French prisoners to Six Nations to compensate for death of Hendrick and others at Battle of Lake George

Johnson's advice to Six Nations includes gathering nations in and being "unanimous in your councils, and also in the field"

French align with Indigenous interests by localizing trade, alliance and influence, and expanding to forts and "real command over the country"

Rogers' Rangers reconnoitre French-held Ticonderoga and Crown Point, and prisoner discloses Marquis de Montcalm's arrival from France

British sloop and companions chased by four large French schooners on Lake Ontario before escaping into Oswego

Lengthy narration of Montcalm's capture of Oswego forts in August and analysis of British mismanagement leading to it

"Best constructed of any in our possession" - Pallisaded Fort Eagle is built with moat near Oswego, but torn down after Oswego's fall

"The main Point" - Lord Loudoun advises Duke of Cumberland to mount campaign against Quebec City by way of St. Lawrence River

Evangelical society wishes to teach "a few Indian Boys" at its New York school, but difficulties (including war) prevent it

Halifax oppressed by military establishment that makes all laws (including by-laws), takes government jobs and even seizes firewood

Indigenous people in Nova Scotia favour French "caressing and courting them," in contrast to violent British (Note: "savages" used)

Rangers sent to Saint John River find transport taken by Acadians who had overwhelmed its crew, but ship burned before rangers can retake it

Acadians gathered under French command outside peninsular Nova Scotia, along with Mi'kmaq and "St. John Indians," number 1,500 men

Gov. Shirley says Massachusetts will not suffer "unreasonable Burthen" of Acadians sent there, but "enable and induce" their self-support

Notice in Bristol, England newspaper of arrival of hundreds of Acadian deportees sent from Virginia, and of local welfare payments made to them

Board of Trade "extremely anxious" that lands vacated by expelled Acadians be soon settled for "future strength and Prosperity of the Colony"

Secretary of State Henry Fox tells Charles Lawrence to improve Chignecto forts and reinforce garrisons with troops coming from Ireland

References 

 
Canada
56